Jonika Airlines is a Ukrainian scheduled and charter airline based at Kyiv International Airport (Zhuliany).

History  
Founded in 2018, the airline started operations after receiving the first Boeing 737-400 in July 2018; a second model was added to the fleet in April 2019 In 2020 the company acquired Airbus A319-100 and Boeing 737-300.

Destinations
Jonika Airlines serves the following destinations as of December 2021:

 Kyiv – Kyiv International Airport (Zhuliany) base
 Athens – Athens International Airport

Fleet
 
As of August 2022, the Jonika Airlines fleet consists of the following aircraft:

See also
 List of airlines of Ukraine

References

External links
 

Airlines of Ukraine
Airlines established in 2012
Ukrainian companies established in 2012